Matthew George Darby, (born 27 August 1967) is a British conservationist and former publisher.  He is the son of Adrian Darby and Lady Meriel Darby, daughter of former British Prime Minister, Sir Alec Douglas-Home (also known as 14th Earl of Home, and Lord Home of the Hirsel).  Home's correspondence with Darby was published as Letters to a Grandson in 1983.    

Darby was the co-creator of the Pocket Canons, a best-selling series of books from the bible published in sixteen countries. The series won a number of awards including the Design and Art Direction (D&AD) Silver Award, 1998 and the Publishers' Publicity Circle award for Generic Campaign of the Year, 1998.  

Darby is married to singer-songwriter Christina Kulukundis and has two children.

References 

 Home of the Hirsel, Lord. (1983). Letters to a Grandson, London: HarperCollins.
 Sunday Times Magazine. (1984).  Relative Values. Interview by Maddox, B.
 The Face (magazine). (1998). Interview
 Debrett's People of Today, 2008. (2007).
 Country Life. (7 June 2007). pp 158–159. Interview

English publishers (people)
Landscape or garden designers
Living people
1967 births
Alumni of the University of Edinburgh